USS Tasco (SP-502), was a United States Navy minesweeper and patrol vessel in commission from 1917 to 1919.

Tasco was built as a commercial tug of the same name in 1907 at New London, Connecticut. 
The U.S. Navy acquired her from her owner, J. Shewan of Brooklyn, New York, on 4 August 1917 for use as a minesweeper and section patrol vessel during World War I. She was commissioned as USS Tasco (SP-502) on 29 September 1917.

Assigned to the 3rd Naval District, Tasco operated along the coastline in the New York City area for the remainder of World War I and into the spring of 1919.

Tasco was stricken from the Navy List on 22 May 1919 and returned to Shewan the same day.

References

Department of the Navy Naval History and Heritage Command Online Library of Selected Images: Civilian Ships: S.S. Tasco (American Salvage Tug, 1907). Served as USS Tasco (SP-502) in 1917-1919
NavSource Online: Section Patrol Craft Photo Archive: Tasco (SP 502)

Minesweepers of the United States Navy
World War I minesweepers of the United States
Patrol vessels of the United States Navy
World War I patrol vessels of the United States
Ships built in New London, Connecticut
1907 ships